Pires is a common surname in the Portuguese language, namely in Portugal and Brazil. It was originally a patronymic, meaning Son of Pedro or Son of Pero. Its Spanish equivalent is Pérez. It is a variant form of Peres. It may mean different things:

People
Alda Ferreira Pires Barreto de Lara Albuquerque (1930-1962), Angolan-Portuguese writer 
Alfredo Pires (born 1964), Timor-Leste politician
Aloísio Pires Alves (born 1963), Brazilian footballer
Álvaro Henrique Alves Pires (born 1985), Brazilian footballer
Anabela Braz Pires (born 1976), Portuguese singer and actress
Arlindo do Carmo Pires Barbeitos (born 1940), Angolan poet
Cléo Pires (born 1982), Brazilian actress
Cornélio Pires (1884–1958), Brazilian journalist, writer and folklorist
Diogo Pires (1500–1532), known as Solomon Molcho, a self-proclaimed Jewish Messiah
Emília Pires, Timor-Leste Minister of Finance
Felipe Pires (born 1995), Brazilian footballer
Fernão Pires de Andrade (died 1523), Portuguese merchant and official
Francisco Fortunato Pires (born 1948), São Toméan politician
Gérard Pirès (born 1942), French film director and writer
Glória Pires (born 1963), Brazilian actress
João Murça Pires (1917–1994), Brazilian botanist
Jorge Costa Pires (born 1981), Portuguese footballer
José Cardoso Pires (1925–1998), Portuguese writer
José Mariano Rebelo Pires Gago, Portuguese high-energy physicist and Minister for Science
Loick Pires (born 1989), English footballer
Luís Pires (15th century/16th century), Portuguese explorer
Maria do Carmo Trovoada Pires de Carvalho Silveira (born 1960), São Toméan politician
Maria João Pires (born 1944), Portuguese pianist
Mário Lemos Pires (1930–2009), last governor of Portuguese Timor
Mário Pires (born 1949), Guinea-Bissau politician and former Prime Minister
Nuno Pires, South African bioinformatician
Paulo Pires (born 1967), Portuguese model and actor
Pedro Pires (born 1934), President of Cape Verde
Robert Pires (born 1973), French footballer
Rosemir Pires (born 1978), Brazilian footballer
Tomé Pires (born 1460s), first Portuguese envoy to China

See also
 Peiris, Sinhala surname of Português origin
 Pirez (disambiguation)
 Píriz, a surname

Portuguese-language surnames
Patronymic surnames
Surnames from given names